Frederick Robson Batty (20 December 1934 – 2007) was an English professional footballer who played in the Football League for Bradford Park Avenue.

References

1934 births
2007 deaths
English footballers
Association football defenders
English Football League players
Stanley United F.C. players
Bradford (Park Avenue) A.F.C. players